The Civil Rights Restoration Act of 1987, or Grove City Bill, is a United States legislative act that specifies that entities receiving federal funds must comply with civil rights legislation in all of their operations, not just in the program or activity that received the funding. The Act overturned the precedent set by the Supreme Court decision in Grove City College v. Bell, 465 U.S. 555 (1984), which held that only the particular program in an educational institution receiving federal financial assistance was required to comply with the anti-discrimination provisions of Title IX of the Education Amendments of 1972, not the institution as a whole.

The Act was first passed by the House in June 1984 (375–32) but failed to pass in either chamber of Congress after divisions over its potential effects on Title IX regulations prohibiting discrimination relating to abortion impeded the effectiveness of a civil rights coalition. In January 1988, the Senate accepted an amendment by Senator John Danforth (R-MO). He is described as "abortion neutral" and clarified that the Act does not impose a requirement for entities receiving federal funding to pay or provide for abortions and that it prohibits discrimination against women who use or seek abortion services. The amendment was opposed the National Organization for Women and other pro-choice groups but ultimately resulted in passage of the bill in both the House and the Senate.

The final vote in the Senate, on January 28, 1988, was 75–14 (48–0 in the Senate Democratic Caucus and 27–14 in the Senate Republican Conference), with 11 members voting present or abstaining. The final vote in the House of Representatives on March 2, 1988, was 315–98 (242–4 in the House Democratic Caucus and 73–94 in the House Republican Conference) with 20 members voting present or abstaining. 

On March 16, 1988, President Ronald Reagan vetoed the bill by arguing that the Act represented an overexpansion of governmental power over private organizational decision-making and "would diminish substantially the freedom and independence of religious institutions in our society." On March 22, 1988, the Senate overrode Reagan's veto by a vote of 73–24 (52–0 in the Senate Democratic Caucus and 21–24 in the Senate Republican Conference) with 3 members voting present or abstaining. On the same day, the House voted in favor of the bill with a vote of 292–133 (240–10 in the House Democratic Caucus and 52–123 in the House Republican Conference), with 7 members voting present or abstaining. Reagan's veto was the first veto of a civil rights act since Andrew Johnson vetoed the Civil Rights Act of 1866. 

In addition to Title IX, the Act applies to the Rehabilitation Act of 1973, Title VI of the Civil Rights Act of 1964, and the Age Discrimination in Employment Act of 1967.

The Act was a response to the Grove City College v. Bell Supreme Court decision in 1984. The decision held that only the particular program in an educational institution receiving federal financial assistance was required to comply with anti-discrimination provisions of Title IX. This decision created loopholes for educational institutions to continue discriminatory practices in other areas, which had a significant impact on minority communities, women, and people with disabilities.

With the passage of the act, educational institutions that receive federal funding, were required to comply with all federal civil rights laws, including those relating to gender, race, and disability. The act also extended protection against discrimination to a wider range of individuals, including students, faculty, and staff.

Since its passage, the act has been critical in ensuring that federal funding is used to promote equality and prevent discrimination. It has been used to hold institutions accountable for discriminatory practices and has helped to create a more equitable society for all individuals.

Sources

External links
 134 Congressional Record (Bound) - Volume 134, Part 1 (January 25, 1988 to February 16, 1988), Congressional Record Senate January 28, 1988 vote roll call p. 394
 134 Congressional Record (Bound) - Volume 134, Part 2 (February 17, 1988 to March 2, 1988), Congressional Record House March 2, 1988 vote roll call p. 2962
 134 Congressional Record (Bound) - Volume 134, Part 4 (March 22, 1988 to March 30, 1988), Congressional Record Senate March 22, 1988 override vote roll call p. 4669
 134 Congressional Record (Bound) - Volume 134, Part 4 (March 22, 1988 to March 30, 1988), Congressional Record House March 22, 1988 override vote roll call p. 4791

United States federal civil rights legislation
1988 in American law